Abbasa is a village in Natel Kenar-e Olya Rural District, in the Central District of Nur County, Mazandaran Province, Iran. At the 2006 census, its population was 2,380, in 562 families.

References 

Populated places in Nur County